CJLS-FM is a Canadian radio station broadcasting at 95.5 FM in Yarmouth, Nova Scotia. The station uses the on-air brand name Y95. The station currently airs an adult contemporary format and is owned by Acadia Broadcasting Limited. The station was one of the first radio stations in the Maritimes.

History
CJLS was founded by Laurie Smith in 1934. Leland G. Trask purchased the company from the Smith Family in 1968. In 1998, Gerry Boudreau, Chris Perry and Ray Zinck, all former employees of CJLS purchased CJLS. For years, CJLS was carried at 1340 kHz on the AM band until the switch to FM after receiving CRTC in 2002. On February 1, 2003, Boudreau retired. On November 16, 2015, it was officially announced via station's website that the station was being sold to Acadia Broadcasting. The acquisition and change of ownership was approved on April 29, 2016.

CJLS holds membership in the Canadian Association of Broadcasters, and the Radio-Television News Directors Association of Canada, and is represented nationally and regionally by Canadian Broadcast Sales.

As of September 16, 2016, CJLS rebranded as Y95 and is still airing an adult contemporary format.

Rebroadcasters
CJLS-FM-1 93.5 FM - New Tusket
CJLS-FM-2 96.3 FM - Barrington
CJLS-FM-3 94.7 FM - Yarmouth

See also
List of radio stations in Nova Scotia

References

External links
Y95

Jls
Jls
Radio stations established in 1934
1934 establishments in Nova Scotia
Acadia Broadcasting radio stations